

Events 
 January 1 – The first edition of Alexandre Balthazar Laurent Grimod de La Reynière's Almanach des gourmands, the first guide to restaurant cooking, is published in Paris.
 January 5 – William Symington demonstrates his Charlotte Dundas, the "first practical steamboat", in Scotland.
 January 30 – Monroe and Livingston sail for Paris to discuss, and possibly buy, New Orleans; they end up completing the Louisiana Purchase.
 February 19 – An Act of Mediation, issued by Napoleon Bonaparte, establishes the Swiss Confederation to replace the Helvetic Republic. Under the terms of the act, Graubünden, St. Gallen, Thurgau, the Ticino and Vaud become Swiss cantons.
 February 19 – Ohio is admitted as the 17th U.S. state.
 February 20 – Kandyan Wars: Kandy, Ceylon is taken by a British detachment.
 February 21 – Edward Despard and six others are hanged and beheaded for plotting to assassinate King George III of the United Kingdom, and to destroy the Bank of England.
 February 24 – Marbury v. Madison: The Supreme Court of the United States establishes the principle of judicial review.
 February 25 – A major redistribution of territorial sovereignty within the Holy Roman Empire is enacted, via an act known as the Reichsdeputationshauptschluss.
 March 9 – Aargau becomes a Swiss canton.

April–June 
 March–April – The franc germinal is introduced in France.
 April 26 – The L'Aigle meteorite falls in Normandy, causing a shift in scientific opinion on the origin of meteorites.
 April 30 – The Louisiana Purchase is made from France by the United States.
 May – First Consul of France, Citizen Bonaparte, begins making preparations to invade England.
 May 18 – The Napoleonic Wars begin, when the United Kingdom declares war on France after France refuses to withdraw from Dutch territory.
 May 19 – Master Malati, a Coptic Christian leader, is beheaded by a Muslim mob in Cairo, Egypt.
 June 7 – Indiana Territory governor (and future U.S. president) William Henry Harrison signs treaties at Fort Wayne, with representatives of the Delaware, Shawnee, Potawatomi, Miami, Kickapoo, Eel River, Wea, Piankeshaw and Kaskaskia Indian tribes. The U.S. Senate ratifies the treaties on November 25.
 June 14 – Napoleon Bonaparte orders the establishment of five military camps to defend the coast of France, located at Bayonne, Ghent, Saint-Omer, Compiègne, Saint-Malo, and one in the occupied Netherlands, at Utrecht. Each one has 20,000 infantry and 2,000 cavalry to defend it.

July–September 
 July 4 – The Louisiana Purchase is announced to the American people.
 July 5 – The convention of Artlenburg leads to the French occupation of Hanover (which had been ruled by the British king).
 July 23 – Robert Emmet's uprising in Ireland begins.
 July 26 – The wagonway between Wandsworth and Croydon is opened, being the first public railway line in England.
 August 3 – The British begin the Second Anglo-Maratha War, against the Scindia Dynasty of Gwalior.
 August 31 – The Lewis and Clark Expedition begins as Lewis and a crew of 11 depart on the Ohio River. 
 September 6 – John Dalton, British scientist, begins using symbols to represent the atoms of different elements.
 September 11 – Second Anglo-Maratha War – Battle of Delhi: British troops under General Lake defeat the Marathas of Scindia's army, under General Louis Bourquin.
 September 20 – Irish rebel Robert Emmet is executed.
 September 23 – Battle of Assaye, India: British-led troops defeat Maratha forces.

October–December 
 October 14 – Orissa, an area of India along the Bay of Bengal that now comprises the Indian state of Odisha, is occupied by the British under the British East India Company, after the Second Anglo-Maratha War.  The Maratha Empire formally cedes the area in the Treaty of Deogaon, signed on December 17.
 October 20 – The Senate ratifies the Louisiana Purchase Treaty, doubling the size of the United States.
 November 18 – Battle of Vertières: The Haitian army, led by Jean-Jacques Dessalines, defeats the army of Napoleon.
 November 30 –
 The Balmis Expedition starts in Spain, with the aim of vaccinating millions against smallpox in Spanish America and the Philippines.
 At the Cabildo in New Orleans, Spanish representatives Governor Manuel de Salcedo and the Marqués de Casa Calvo officially transfer Louisiana (New Spain) to French representative Prefect Pierre Clément de Laussat. Barely three weeks later, France transfers the same land to the United States.
 December 9 – The proposed Twelfth Amendment to the United States Constitution, requiring that electoral ballots distinctly list the choice for president and the choice for vice president, is approved by Congress for submission to the states for ratification; passed in the wake of the problems in the 1800 presidential election, the amendment is ratified by 13 of the 17 states and is proclaimed in effect on September 25, 1804.
 December 20 – The Louisiana Purchase is completed as the French prefect, de Laussat, formally transfers ownership of land between the Mississippi River and the Rocky Mountains to the United States, by way of commissioners William C. C. Claiborne and James Wilkinson.  Claiborne is appointed as the area's first American governor.

Undated 
 Major breakthroughs in chemistry occur, with the identification of the elements rhodium and palladium (by William Hyde Wollaston); osmium and iridium (by Smithson Tennant); and cerium (by Wilhelm Hisinger, Jons Jakob Berzelius and Martin Heinrich Klaproth)

Births

January–June 

 February 2 – Albert Sidney Johnston, American Confederate general (d. 1862)
 February 15
 Karl Friedrich Schimper, German botanist, naturalist and poet (d. 1867)
 John Sutter, German-American pioneer (d. 1880)
 February 26 – Arnold Adolph Berthold, German physiologist, zoologist (d. 1861)
 March 12 – Guillaume de Felice, Savoy nobleman, abolitionist (d. 1871)
 March 16 – Nikolay Yazykov, Russian poet, Slavophile (d. 1846)
 March 27 – Charles Lafontaine, Swiss mesmerist (d. 1892)
 April 7 – Flora Tristan, French feminist (d. 1844)
 April 30
 Jeremiah E. Cary, American politician (d. 1888)
 Albrecht von Roon, Prime Minister of Prussia (d. 1879)
 May 12 – Justus von Liebig, German chemist (d. 1873)
 May 20 – Ann Walker, English landowner and philanthropist (d. 1854)
 May 24 – Charles Lucien Bonaparte, French naturalist, ornithologist (d. 1857)
 May 25
 Edward Bulwer-Lytton, English novelist, playwright and politician (d. 1873)
 Ralph Waldo Emerson, American writer (d. 1882)
 June 8 – Amalia Assur, Swedish dentist (d. 1889)
 June 24 – George James Webb, English-born composer (d. 1887)

July–December 

 July 10 – William Todd (1803–1873), American businessman, Canadian senate nominee
 July 20 – John Hymers, English mathematician (d. 1887)
 July 24 – Adolphe Adam, French composer (d. 1856)
 July 31 – John Ericsson, Swedish inventor, engineer (d. 1889)
 August – Francesca Anna Canfield, American linguist, poet and translator (d. 1833)
 August 3
 Mary Dominus, American settler of Hawaii (d. 1889)
 Sir Joseph Paxton, English gardener, architect and Member of Parliament (d. 1865)
 August 10 – Joseph Vinoy, French general (d. 1880)
 August 13 – Vladimir Odoyevsky, Russian philosopher, writer, music critic (d. 1869)
 August 18 – Nathan Clifford, American politician, Associate Justice of the Supreme Court of the United States (d. 1881)
 August 23 
 Jan Erazim Vocel, Czech poet, archaeologist, historian and cultural revivalist (d. 1871)
 Gustaf Wappers, Belgian painter (d. 1874)
 August 27 – Edward Beecher, American theologian (d. 1895)
 September 4
 Anna Nielsen, Danish mezzo-soprano (d. 1856)
 Sarah Childress Polk, First Lady of the United States (d. 1891)
 September 9 – Osgood Johnson, 5th Principal of Phillips Academy, Andover, Massachusetts (d. 1837)
 September 11 – Francisca Zubiaga y Bernales, first lady of Peru, controversial socialite (d. 1835)
 September 27 – Samuel Francis Du Pont, American admiral (d. 1865)
 September 28 – Prosper Mérimée, French writer (d. 1870)
 September 29 – Mercator Cooper, American sea captain (d. 1872)
 September 30 – Gustav von Alvensleben, Prussian general (d. 1881)
 October 5 – Friedrich Bernhard Westphal, Danish-German painter (d. 1844)
 October 16 – Robert Stephenson, English civil engineer (d. 1859)
 November 11 – Adolf von Bonin, Prussian general (d. 1872)
 November 14 – Jacob Abbott, American writer (d. 1879)
 November 29
 Christian Doppler, Austrian mathematician (d. 1853)
 Gottfried Semper, German architect (d. 1879)
 December 5 – Fyodor Tyutchev, great Russian Romantic poet (d. 1873)
 December 6 – Susanna Moodie, English writer (d. 1885)
 December 11 – Hector Berlioz, French composer (d. 1869)

Date unknown 
Barbarita Nieves, Venezuelan mistress of José Antonio Páez (d. 1847)

Deaths

January–June 

 January 1 – James Woodforde, English clergyman, diarist (b. 1740)
 January 18 – Ippolit Bogdanovich, Russian poet (b. 1743)
 January 23 – Arthur Guinness, Irish brewer (b. 1725)
 February 1 – Anders Chydenius, Finnish priest, politician (b. 1729)
 February 3 – María Isidra de Guzmán y de la Cerda, Spanish scholar (b. 1768)
 February 9 – Jean François de Saint-Lambert, French poet (b. 1716)
 February 11 – Jean-François de La Harpe, French critic (b. 1739)
 February 18 – Johann Wilhelm Ludwig Gleim, German poet (b. 1719)
 February 20 – Marie Dumesnil, French actress (b. 1713)
 February 22 – Jacques-Donatien Le Ray de Chaumont, French Father of the American Revolution (b. 1726)
 February 23 – Praskovia Kovalyova-Zhemchugova, Russian serf actress, opera soprano (b. 1768)
 February 21 – Edward Despard, British revolutionary (b. 1751)
 March 14 – Friedrich Gottlieb Klopstock, German poet (b. 1724)
 March 28 – Peter Du Cane, Sr., British businessman (b. 1713)
 April 2 – Sir James Montgomery, 1st Baronet, Scottish politician, judge (b. 1721)
 April 6 – William Hamilton, British diplomat, antiquary (b. 1730)
 April 7
 Antoine de Bosc de la Calmette, Danish statesman, landscape architect (b. 1752)
 Toussaint L'Ouverture, Haitian revolutionary (b. 1743)
 April 14 – Christoph Anton Migazzi, Austrian Catholic bishop (b. 1714)
 April 24 – Adélaïde Labille-Guiard, French portrait painter (b. 1749)
 May 29 – Louis-Antoine Caraccioli, French writer (b. 1719)
 June 24 – Matthew Thornton, American signer of the Declaration of Independence (b. 1714)
 June 26 – Fermín Lasuén, Spanish missionary (b. 1736)

July–December 

 August 24 – James Napper Tandy, Irish republican
 September 5 – Pierre Choderlos de Laclos, French general, author (b. 1741)
 September 13 – John Barry, officer in the Continental Navy during the American Revolutionary War, later in the United States Navy (b. 1745)
 September 15
 Gian Francesco Albani, Italian Catholic cardinal (b. 1719)
 François Devienne, French composer (b. 1759)
 September 16 – Nicolas Baudin, French explorer (b. 1754)
 September 17 – Franz Xaver Süssmayr, Austrian composer (b. 1766)
 September 23 – Joseph Ritson, English antiquary (b. 1752)
 September 27 – Frances Brett Hodgkinson, English-born American actress (b. 1771)
 October 2 – Samuel Adams, American revolutionary leader (b. 1722)
 October 8 – Vittorio Alfieri, Italian dramatist, poet (b. 1749)
 October 14 – Louis Claude de Saint-Martin, French philosopher (b. 1743)
 October 26 – Granville Leveson-Gower, 1st Marquess of Stafford, English politician (b. 1721)
 October 31 – Pandara Vanniyan, last King of Vanni (defeated by Lt. von Driberg)
 November 11 – Raphael Cohen, German rabbi (b. 1722)
 November 17 – John Willett Payne, British Royal Navy admiral (b. 1752)
 November 18 – Ditlevine Feddersen, Norwegian culture figure (b. 1727)
 November 25 – Joseph Wilton, English sculptor (b. 1722)
 December 7 – Gerrit Paape, Dutch politician, writer (b. 1752)
 December 15 – Dru Drury, English entomologist (b. 1725)
 December 18 – Johann Gottfried Herder, German philosopher, writer (b. 1744)
 December 26 – Gian Carlo Passeroni, Italian writer (b. 1713)
 December 30 – Francis Lewis, American signer of the Declaration of Independence (b. 1713)

Date unknown 
 Moscho Tzavela, Greek-Souliote heroine (b. 1760)

References